Rebutia arenacea, the arenaceous crown cactus, is a species of cactus in the genus Rebutia, native to central Bolivia. It has gained the Royal Horticultural Society's Award of Garden Merit.

References

arenacea
Endemic flora of Bolivia
Plants described in 1951